Zerzura is a 2017 Nigerien western film directed by Christopher Kirkley and co-produced by director himself with Rhissa Koutata, Ahmoudou Madassane, and Guichene Mohamed. The film stars Habiba Almoustapha with Ahmoudou Madassane, Ibrahim Affi, and Zara Alhassane in supporting roles. It is an ethnofiction shot in the Sahara desert, where a young man from Niger leaves home in search of an enchanted oasis.

The film was shot in Agadez, Niger. The film premiered on 19 July 2017 in the United States. The film received mixed reviews from critics and screened in many film festivals.

Cast
 Habiba Almoustapha as Habiba
 Ahmoudou Madassane as Ahmoudou
 Ibrahim Affi as Uncle
 Zara Alhassane as Mother
 Rhissa Elryin as Man in hole
 Guichene Mohamed as Bandit #1
 Rhissa Koutata as Bandit #2

References

External links 
 

Nigerien drama films
2017 films
2017 Western (genre) films